The KL Monorail Line is one of the operational monorail systems in Malaysia. Operated as part of the RapidKL system by Rapid Rail, a subsidiary of Prasarana Malaysia, it is one of the components of the Klang Valley Integrated Transit System. The line is numbered 8 and coloured light green on official transit maps.

History
This urban monorail line was opened on 31 August 2003, with 11 stations running  on two parallel elevated tracks. It connects the KL Sentral transport hub in the south and Titiwangsa in the north with the "Golden Triangle", a commercial, shopping, and entertainment area consisting of the Bukit Bintang area, and surrounded by Jalan Imbi, Jalan Bukit Bintang, Jalan Sultan Ismail, and Jalan Raja Chulan.

The monorail scheme was announced by Kuala Lumpur City Hall in January 1990 after the Malaysian Government gave the go-ahead to the scheme at a cabinet meeting in June 1989. Its cost was then estimated at RM 143 million. The 14-km, 22-station system is designed to carry more than 34,000 passengers a day on a 20-minute loop through Kuala Lumpur's bustling commercial core. The plan is to build it in two phases: in the first, 16 stations will be serviced over 7.7 km; and in the later stage, another 6.5-km loop will be added. The first phase was expected to be completed within two years.

According to plans dating back to the 1990s, the planned line was to have two branches (similar to the Ampang and Sri Petaling Lines), with one branch going via Maharajalela station and then on to the city centre, and the other branch going to Mid Valley, Abdullah Hukum, Jalan Klang Lama and ending at Kampung Pasir, which will probably include integration with KTM Komuter's Port Klang Line at Petaling or Pantai Dalam stations. KL Sentral and Tun Sambanthan were planned to be the common stations. Ultimately only the downtown branch was built, due to the 1997 Asian financial crisis.

Work was scheduled to begin in June 1990, but was postponed to May 1991, after the city's mayor complained that tenders submitted for preparatory work were too high. There has been no activity on the project since and few details are available on how the project is expected to proceed. The main contractor is a local company, BNK, which had little success in its search for backers to finance its share of the venture. Part of its problem in securing money stems from the project's escalating cost estimates, and part from its lack of a track record in handling such huge projects.

Construction was re-initiated by Hitachi, Ltd., but the 1997 Asian financial crisis led to cessation of work in December 1997. When work was resumed in July 1998, MTrans Holdings took over, locally manufacturing its own rolling stock and completing the project to save cost; the line was completed at a cost of MYR 1.18 billion.

As the line was opened in 2003, it was agreed that the parent company and owner of the KL Monorail Line, KL Infrastructure Group, would hold a 40-year concession to operate the monorail. The line and number of stations remains unchanged since 2003. Based on 1999 trasnit map, Originally KL monorail line have 19 stations, start from Titiwangsa, Chow Kit, Wawasan, P. Ramlee, Raja Chulan, Bukit Bintang, Imbi, Hang Tuah, Merdeka, Sultan Sulaiman (cancelled), Tun Sambanthan, subsequently unbuild line from Syed Putra, Taman Seputeh, Abdullah Hukum, Lembah Pantai, Pantai Dalam, Taman Desa, OUG and Kampung Pasir.

Since the start of operations, the KL Infrastructure Group suffered losses due largely to depreciation and interest repayment costs. For the financial year to 30 April 2004, KL Infra posted a net loss of MYR 46.24 million on a MYR 15.08 million revenue. KL Infra had also taken up a MYR 300 million Malaysian government loan and a MYR 260 million infrastructure loan from the Bank Pembangunan Malaysia Berhad (BPMB) (The development bank of Malaysia) (BPM). In addition, KL Infra had proposed to buy MTrans' three subsidiary companies to improve its business, but failed after Scomi bought up some of the targeted companies.

Government takeover
In April 2007, talks were under way between KL Infra and the government and the Bank Pembangunan Malaysia Berhad to sell the KL Monorail Line to the Prasarana Malaysia, which then had already owned both the Kelana Jaya Line and the Ampang Line, as well as 10% of KL Infra shares. KL Infra was cited as intending to exit Malaysia's monorail business. The takeover is part of the government's master plan to improve the urban public transport sector.

SPN gave its agreement in principle to the takeover on 22 December 2006 and a follow-up meeting was held on 6 February 2007 with the government on the takeover of its operational assets and assumption of loan liabilities. A due diligence audit was conducted from 5 March 2007 to 27 April 2007 by consultants appointed by the government. Following agreement to the takeover, BPM granted KL Monorail an extension until 29 April 2007 for an interest repayment amounting to MYR 4,244,801.91, which was originally due on 29 December 2006.

However, the takeover seemed to have suffered a setback at least from the perspective of KL Infra when on 26 March 2007, it was notified by BPM that it was not going to entertain any further extensions for interest repayment. Subsequently on 27 April 2007, the bank notified that it would not be granting any moratorium on interest repayments. On 29 April 2007, KL Monorail was not able to make the repayment of the interest instalment which had become due.

On 3 May 2007, KL Monorail was issued a default notice by BPM which sought repayment of the entire principal sum of MYR 609,616,423.73 and capitalised interest of MYR 296,428,910.88 totalling MYR 906,045,334.61. The company was granted seven days from that day to repay the entire sum, which it failed to do. On 14 May 2007, Mohd Anwar Bin Yahya and Cho Choo Meng were appointed receivers and managers by Amanah Raya, the Security Trustee for BPM. Nevertheless, the takeover process is still deemed ongoing, KL Infra stating that it will continue to engage the government and BPM to address the proposed takeover of KL Monorail by Prasarana based on earlier discussions and an approval in principle.

One of the effects of the appointment of receivers and managers is the possibility that KL Infra will not be receiving any compensation for KL Monorail should the takeover by SPN go through.

The trading of KL Infra was suspended from 15 May 2007. On the same day, KL Infra's board announced to Bursa Malaysia that it had formed the opinion that it was not solvent and would not be able to pay all its debts in full within a period not exceeding twelve months. On 28 November 2007, Prasarana Malaysia signed a sale-and-purchase agreement with KL Monorail Systems, effectively making Prasarana the operator of KL Monorail, and resulting in Prasarana taking over the MYR 882 million BPM loan.

List of stations

The line consists of a single dual-way line that links areas of inner Kuala Lumpur  not served by rail transport, namely Brickfields, Bukit Bintang, and Chow Kit, with existing LRT, MRT and KTM Komuter stations at KL Sentral, Muzium Negara, Hang Tuah, Bukit Bintang, Bukit Nanas, and Titiwangsa. The two termini are on a single track with a Spanish solution layout.

The stations are designed as elevated structures with ticketing facilities on either the ground level (as seen in the KL Sentral station) or the first-floor level. The platforms are on the top floor, separated from the monorail lines by fencing. They were originally covered by large canvas roofs, which were replaced in 2014 by aluminium zinc roofs. Certain stations are situated above roadways, or are slightly longer than others. Each station used to be designated with a sponsor, with route maps associating each station with a particular product brand.

The depot is between KL Sentral and Tun Sambanthan.

{
  "type": "ExternalData",
  "service": "geoline",
  "ids": "Q1790833",
  "properties": {
    "stroke": "#7dba00",
    "stroke-width": 6
  }
}

Expansion
To some extent, the line has been designed to accommodate future expansion. While some stations are significantly longer than the current two-car sets, providing room for longer train sets, extension works for other stations have been necessary. An expansion project known as the KL Monorail Fleet Expansion project is being carried out by Prasarana to ensure a more efficient and user-friendly monorail services in the future. The installation of the Platform Automatic Gate System (PAGS) is one such work under the project. This gate system is necessary to improve passenger safety as before this, there are no barriers between the passenger platforms and the tracks and this may pose dangers to the users. The project also includes the installation of a new signalling system, construction of a new depot to accommodate larger train sets, and other station upgrades and universal access facilities.

An example of station upgrades is at Bukit Bintang station. Touted as one of the busiest stations of the line due to its proximity to Bukit Bintang, the hub of shopping and entertainment in Kuala Lumpur, it used to have only one exit, but the upgrading project now provided the station with added an alternative entrance and exit walkway and a direct entry to the Lot 10 and Sungei Wang Plaza shopping complexes. The monorail station is also equipped with new ticket vending machines and ticketing gates. Other than that, escalators and lifts as well as a new Customer Service Office are also provided. Another example is at the second busiest monorail station, Kuala Lumpur Sentral station, where the Nu Sentral Mall overhead bridge becomes the new entrance to the station. Previously, monorail users needed to exit KL Sentral and cross the busy main thoroughfare in Brickfields to reach the station. The completion of the overhead bridge now enables customers to travel between KL Sentral and the monorail station safely and conveniently.

The main goal of the fleet expansion project is, however, the introduction of new, state-of-the-art four-car trains. Two four-car trains have been introduced to the public while the rest will be delivered in stages until the fourth quarter of 2015. The new four-car trains can accommodate up to 430 passengers per trip and could significantly reduce the waiting time for passengers. They are also more comfortable and spacious than the current two-car trains. After all sets of four-car trains have been delivered and commissioned, the two-car sets, which have been in operation since 2003, would be retired. Besides having a larger capacity, the new trains are also fitted with better safety features including open-door windows, on-board closed-circuit television cameras and "run-flat" features, which allow the trains to continue moving in the event of a puncture.

Rolling stock

The first trains used on the KL Monorail line were permanently coupled two-car trains of a similar design to the Seattle Center Monorail's ALWEG trains. Each monorail train can accommodate 158 passengers during regular operations. The monorail carriages themselves were constructed by Scomi Rail, a Malaysian monorail manufacturer, at the Scomi Rail plant in Rawang, which also featured its own tracks for monorail train tests.

KL Monorail subsequently began upgrading its rolling stock to brand-new, four-car trains. These were also manufactured by Scomi, this time to the company's in-house-developed SUTRA design, which was also ordered by the Mumbai Monorail line in India. Each of these trains can accommodate 430 passengers per trip, compared with 213 passengers for the two-car trains. The new trains are equipped with four closed-circuit television cameras and space for wheelchairs and strollers.

The first two four-car trains entered service in December 2014, with the remaining units scheduled to be arriving in stages. While they were initially all scheduled to be in operation by the end of 2015, only five have been delivered so far. They were taken out of service in May 2017 due to safety reasons. Three of the four-car trains have been reinstated in August 2019, with two more expected to re-enter service in November of the same year. Once delivery of the four-car trains is complete, the original ALWEG two-car trains will be decommissioned.

Fleet details & formation

Below is the list of the 2-car Scomi MTrans:

Below is the list of the 4-car Scomi SUTRA:

The 4-car Scomi SUTRA has 2 livery colour

Ridership
The monthly ridership increased from 341,850 passengers in September 2003 to 1.18 million passengers in August 2004. In January 2007, the monorail attained its 50 millionth passenger since its opening. On 29 July 2009, the monorail reportedly reached the 100 million passenger mark.

Accident and incidents

David Chelliah accident
Prior to the opening, on 16 August 2002 an accident occurred during a test run involving a  safety wheel falling off a train and hitting the head of a pedestrian walking under the monorail viaduct at Jalan Sultan Ismail. The victim, David Chelliah, a journalist, suffered injuries that required hospitalisation.

On 7 March 2003, Chelliah filed a MYR 5 million negligence suit against the companies involved in the design, installation and operation of the trains, as well as the Director-General of Railways. On 8 April 2003, the High Court ruled that the Monorail company was liable for the incident, but not the Director-General of Railways. Although the monorail company reported that any such accident was "unlikely" as six bolts would have to be removed for it to occur and furthermore, a check of all 23 other safety wheels on the train involved did not turn up any other issues, the high court judgement ruled that the monorail company "failed to provide a reasonable explanation as to how the safety wheel had come off the train and instead relied on the possibility that there had been tampering by unknown persons".

As a result of this accident, the launch of the monorail was postponed.

Burst tyre incident
On 22 January 2005, a pneumatic load tyre suddenly burst and caused two women passengers to be injured. The train, carrying about 30 passengers, was about to move from Chow Kit station to Titiwangsa station when the incident occurred at about 8.50pm. The burst tyre caused a rubber sidewall panel to flip open which then hit the side of a passenger seat and injured a woman's legs and another woman's hands. Train services were suspended for about 30 minutes following the incident.

Breakdown
On 11 August 2012, a train stalled near Tun Sambanthan in Brickfields. The breakdown caused 183 passengers to be trapped for about two hours. The air conditioning system in the carriage stopped functioning when the power supply was cut. As a result, some passengers had to break the windows to allow air in while awaiting rescue. Fire and Rescue Department personnel later used a skylift to rescue passengers trapped in the carriage. Investigation revealed that the issue was due to a power supply disruption at the circuit breaker, causing the auxiliary power system to fail.

Six days later, another breakdown occurred. A train stalled between Imbi and Bukit Bintang for about 30 minutes, trapping around 200 passengers. This time however, there was power in the train and the air-conditioning system was functional. Train services resumed after half an hour.

Titiwangsa station fire
On 30 March 2015, a monorail service was temporarily delayed when a tyre of a two-car train coach caught fire at the Titiwangsa Station. The scene was recovered hours later.

Maharajalela station fire
On 24 December 2020, around 7.30am, when a KL Monorail train bound for KL Sentral was approaching the Maharajalela station, one of its tires burst and caught fire. There's no injuries/casualties in the accident, but the Scomi's 4-car train set 24 has been seriously damaged.

Proposed extension 
Phase 1: from KL Sentral to Happy Garden/Jalan Klang Lama (part of the original 1990s proposal)
Phase 2:  from Happy Garden to Sunway (replaced by Kelana Jaya Line extension and Sunway BRT)
Phase 3:  from Titiwangsa to Matrade

References

External links

 Construction - Monorail extension to Old Klang Road/Sunway Overweight
 Kuala Lumpur Monorail - a Photo Essay at the Monorail Society
 Land Public Transport Commission
 Prasarana Malaysia
 MyRapid
 Klang Valley Mass Rapid Transit Project
 TransitMy
 App Store

Route maps
 Route search - Interactive transport guide of Kuala Lumpur public transport system
 Train Journey Planner & Fare Calculator from thepricechat.com
 Route Map from stesensentral.com

Monorails
Alweg people movers
Railway lines opened in 2003
2003 establishments in Malaysia
 
Monorails in Malaysia